Patrick Joseph Burke (26 January 1904 – 9 September 1985) was an Irish Fianna Fáil politician who served as a Teachta Dála (TD) from 1944 to 1973.

A hospital official before entering politics, he was first elected to Dáil Éireann as a Fianna Fáil TD for the Dublin County constituency at the 1944 general election. He was re-elected at each subsequent general election until he retired at the 1973 general election. He was known locally as Bishop Burke. His son Ray Burke succeeded him, when he was elected as a Fianna Fáil TD for Dublin County North at the 1973 general election.

See also
Families in the Oireachtas

References

1904 births
1985 deaths
Fianna Fáil TDs
Members of the 12th Dáil
Members of the 13th Dáil
Members of the 14th Dáil
Members of the 15th Dáil
Members of the 16th Dáil
Members of the 17th Dáil
Members of the 18th Dáil
Members of the 19th Dáil
Politicians from County Dublin